MicroProse is an American video game publisher and developer founded by Bill Stealey, Sid Meier, and Andy Hollis in 1982. It developed and published numerous games, including starting the Civilization and X-COM series. Most of their internally developed titles were vehicle simulation and strategy games.

In 1993, the company lost most of its UK-based personnel and became a subsidiary of Spectrum HoloByte. Subsequent cuts and corporate policies led to Sid Meier, Jeff Briggs and Brian Reynolds leaving and forming Firaxis Games in 1996, as MicroProse closed its ex-Simtex development studio in Austin, Texas. In 1998, following an unsuccessful buyout attempt by GT Interactive, the struggling MicroProse (Spectrum HoloByte) became a wholly owned subsidiary of Hasbro Interactive and its development studios in Alameda, California and Chapel Hill, North Carolina were closed the following year. In 2001, MicroProse ceased to exist as an entity and Hasbro Interactive sold the MicroProse intellectual properties to Infogrames Entertainment, SA. MicroProse UK's former main office in Chipping Sodbury was closed in 2002, followed by the company's former headquarters in Hunt Valley, Maryland in 2003.

The brand was revived in 2007 when Interactive Game Group acquired it from Atari Interactive, formerly Infogrames. The MicroProse brand was licensed to the Legacy Engineering Group for consumer electronics. Cybergun owned the MicroProse brand from 2010 to 2018, which was then acquired by David Lagettie working with Stealey.

History

Independent company (1982–1993)

1980s
In summer 1982, mutual friends who knew of their shared interest in aviation arranged for retired military pilot Bill Stealey and computer programmer Sid Meier to meet in Las Vegas. After Meier surprised Stealey by repeatedly defeating him when playing Red Baron, he explained that he had analyzed the game's programming to predict future actions and claimed that he could design a better home computer game in one week. Stealey promised to sell the game if Meier could develop it. Although Meier needed two months to produce Hellcat Ace, Stealey sold 50 copies in his first sales appointment and the game became the first product of their new company. They planned to name it Smugger's Software, but chose MicroProse. (In 1987 the company agreed to change its name to avoid confusion with MicroPro International, but MicroPro decided to rename itself after its WordStar word processor). MicroProse became profitable in its second month and had $10 million in sales by 1986.

MicroProse advertised its first batch of games in 1982, under the headline "Experience the MicroProse Challenge!!!" All three were written by Sid Meier for the Atari 8-bit family of home computers: platformer Floyd of the Jungle, 2D shooter Chopper Rescue, and first-person airplane combat game Hellcat Ace. Hellcat Ace began a series of increasingly sophisticated 8-bit flight simulation games, including Spitfire Ace (1982) and Solo Flight (1983), that defined the company.

In 1983, MicroProse ported Floyd of the Jungle to the Commodore 64, their first product for that machine. By 1984, the company had begun supporting the Apple II and IBM compatibles. MicroProse released the air traffic control game Kennedy Approach, written by Andy Hollis, in 1985. Conflict in Vietnam (1986) was the final MicroProse title for the Atari 8-bit line.

By 1987, Computer Gaming World considered MicroProse one of the top five computer game companies, alongside likes of Activision and Electronic Arts.

MicroProse also started a branch in the United Kingdom to cross-publish titles in Europe, and to import some European titles to be published in the United States. Notable products from this period include simulation games F-15 Strike Eagle, F-19 Stealth Fighter, Gunship, Project Stealth Fighter, Red Storm Rising and Silent Service, and action-strategy games such as Sid Meier's Pirates! and Sword of the Samurai. Several games from different developers were also published by MicroProse under the labels "Firebird" and "Rainbird" (acquired after buying Telecomsoft in May 1989), including Mr. Heli, Midwinter and Core Design's Rick Dangerous. During the same period, MicroProse created two labels: MicroStyle (UK), and MicroPlay Software (US), using them for publishing a variety of externally developed games, such as Challenge of the Five Realms, Command HQ, Global Conquest, Elite Plus, Flames of Freedom, Rick Dangerous, Stunt Car Racer, Xenophobe and XF5700 Mantis.

1990s
In the early 1990s, MicroProse released the strategy games Sid Meier's Railroad Tycoon and Sid Meier's Civilization, designed by Meier and developed by its internal division, MPS Labs, on multiple platforms. Critically acclaimed, both of them quickly became two of the bestselling strategy games of all time and spawned multiple sequels. Some of MicroProse's simulation games from the 1980s received remakes in the early 1990s, such as Night Hawk: F-117A Stealth Fighter 2.0, Silent Service II and Gunship 2000, and made some first cautious attempts to expand into the console market with F-117A Stealth Fighter and Super Strike Eagle (MicroProse also ported several of their titles to the 16- and 32-bit consoles during the mid-1990s). Brand new simulation and strategy titles included 1942: The Pacific Air War, Dogfight, Fields of Glory, Formula One Grand Prix, Harrier Jump Jet, Knights of the Sky, Starlord, Subwar 2050 and Task Force 1942.

MicroProse attempted to diversify beyond its niche roots as a sim and strategy game company, looking for opportunities into the arcade game industry. MicroProse designed further action-strategy titles such as Covert Action (also designed by Sid Meier) and Hyperspeed, and experimented with the role-playing genre by developing BloodNet and Darklands (in addition to publishing The Legacy: Realm of Terror). The company invested a large sum of money to create its arcade game division as well as their own graphic adventure game engine. Meier felt that Stealey was taking the company in a risky direction, and the two could not work out their differences.  Meier opted to quietly sell Stealey his share of the company but remained on in the same apparent role for all other purposes to the rest of the staff and their customers to allow Stealey to proceed in this direction.

The arcade division did not perform well, and was canceled after making only two games: F-15 Strike Eagle: The Arcade Game and Battle of the Solar System (both of which featured high-end 3D graphics but failed to become popular as they were too different from existing machines), while the adventure game engine was used for just three games: Rex Nebular and the Cosmic Gender Bender, Return of the Phantom and Dragonsphere, before it was sold off to Sanctuary Woods.

In August 1991, MicroProse filed for an initial public offering. The company hoped to raise $18 million to help repay debts from its unsuccessful arcade games.  In 1992 MicroProse acquired Paragon Software. It also acquired Leeds-based flight simulation developer Vektor Grafix, which had already developed titles for them (such as B-17 Flying Fortress), turning it into a satellite development studio named MicroProse Leeds.

Under Spectrum HoloByte (1993–1998)
In December 1993, following Black Wednesday in the UK, MicroProse Software Inc. merged with Spectrum HoloByte, another game company that specialized in simulation games, to form MicroProse Inc. Bill Stealey, who was good friends with Spectrum HoloByte president Gilman Louie, convinced Louie to help MicroProse as Stealey was afraid that some bank would not understand the company culture. MicroProse UK was forced to close its two satellite studios of MicroProse in northern England and dispose of over 40 staff at its Chipping Sodbury head office (Microprose Chipping Sodbury). A core group of artists, designers, and programmers left MicroProse UK to join Psygnosis, which opened an office in Stroud specifically to attract ex-MicroProse employees. In 1994, Stealey departed MicroProse and Spectrum HoloByte agreed to buy out his shares. He later commented, "Spectrum Holobyte had a lot of cash and very few products. Microprose had a lot of products and no cash. It was a great marriage, but the new company only needed one chairman, so I resigned." Stealey went on to found an independent game company Interactive Magic (also specializing in vehicle simulators and strategy games), while Andy Hollis departed for Origin Systems, and Sandy Petersen joined id Software.

Spectrum Holobyte managed to line up licenses, including Top Gun (Top Gun: Fire At Will), Magic: The Gathering (Magic: The Gathering), Star Trek: The Next Generation (A Final Unity, Birth of the Federation, Klingon Honor Guard) and MechWarrior (MechCommander, MechWarrior 3). Strategy game X-COM: UFO Defense proved to be an unanticipated hit in 1994, spawning multiple sequels. In 1996, Spectrum HoloByte/MicroProse bought out Simtex, earlier a developer of MicroProse-published bestsellers Master of Orion and Master of Magic. Simtex was re-branded as MicroProse Texas (Master of Orion II: Battle at Antares), based in Austin, Texas. Other MicroProse developed and/or published games during that period included 7th Legion, Addiction Pinball, AEGIS: Guardian of the Fleet, Civilization II, Dark Earth, F-15 Strike Eagle III, Fleet Defender, Grand Prix 2, Pizza Tycoon, Sid Meier's Colonization, Tinhead, Transport Tycoon, X-COM: Apocalypse, X-COM: Interceptor and X-COM: Terror from the Deep. Insufficient financial resources largely prevented MicroProse from developing games for other game platforms, therefore MicroProse concentrated on the PC game market.

MicroProse Software continued as separate subsidiary company under Spectrum HoloByte until 1996. That year, Spectrum HoloByte started cutting a majority of the MicroProse staff to reduce costs. Soon after, it consolidated all of its titles under the MicroProse brand (essentially renaming itself MicroProse). MicroProse's remaining co-founder Sid Meier, along with Jeff Briggs and Brian Reynolds, departed the company after the staff cut, forming a new company named Firaxis Games.

On October 5, 1997, GT Interactive announced that it had signed a definitive agreement to acquire MicroProse for $250 million in stock. The deal was unanimously approved by the Board of Directors of both companies. After the announcement MicroProse's stock price reached $7 a share. GT Interactive expected the deal to be completed by the end of that year. The acquisition was canceled on December 5, as according to both CEOs "the time is simply not right" for the deal. MicroProse's stock plummeted to just $2.31 after the announcement of the deal's cancellation, and the company had estimated losses of $7–10 million during the third quarter of 1997 which are largely attributed to dislocations caused by the aborted merger. According to Computer Gaming World, the merger was annulled due to a "fundamental" disagreement over how the joint company would be writing off its research and development costs, as MicroProse insisted to keep their method of paying off the developer immediately.

In November 1997, MicroProse was sued by both Avalon Hill (who had the U.S. publishing rights to the name Civilization) and Activision for copyright infringement. MicroProse responded by buying Hartland Trefoil, which was the original designer and manufacturer of the Civilization board game, and then sued Avalon Hill and Activision for trademark infringement and unfair business practices as a result of Activision's decision to develop and publish Civilization video games. Because Hasbro was negotiating the acquisition of both Avalon Hill and MicroProse, the lawsuits were settled in July 1998. Under the terms of the settlement MicroProse became the sole owner of the rights of the name Civilization and Activision acquired a license to publish a Civilization video game which was later titled Civilization: Call to Power.

Under Hasbro Interactive (1998–2001)
In preparation for its sale, MicroProse closed down its studio in Austin in June 1998; as a result of the closure, 35 employees lost their jobs. On August 14, 1998, Hasbro issued a $70 million cash tender offer to purchase all MicroProse's shares for $6 each. This deal was completed on September 14, when Hasbro bought 91% of MicroProse's shares and announced that MicroProse had become a wholly owned subsidiary. The remaining shares would also be acquired for $6 in cash. MicroProse was merged with Hasbro Interactive. At the time of Hasbro's acquisition, MicroProse had 343 employees, including 135 at Alameda, California (MicroProse Alameda), with a total operating cost of $20 million per year. Besides the development studio in Alameda, MicroProse had three other studios: Hunt Valley, Maryland (Microprose, Hunt Valley); Chapel Hill, North Carolina; and Chipping Sodbury, England.

In December 1998, MicroProse finally managed to publish Falcon 4.0 (in development by Spectrum HoloByte since 1992), to disappointing sales. In December 1999, Hasbro Interactive closed down former MicroProse studios in Alameda and Chapel Hill. Among titles in development that got canceled during that period was X-COM: Genesis. The last MicroProse developed game under Hasbro, B-17 Flying Fortress: The Mighty 8th, was published in 2000.

Under Infogrames (2001–2003)
In January 2001, after French game publisher Infogrames Entertainment, SA (IESA) took over Hasbro Interactive for $100 million, the company was renamed to Infogrames Interactive. and the long development of X-COM: Alliance was finally aborted.

Infogrames began to slowly phase out the brand name, with many MicroProse branded titles that were previously released by Hasbro being reissued with Infogrames' logo on the packaging. The final two games branded under the MicroProse name were Tactical Ops: Assault on Terror and Grand Prix 4. The two remaining MicroProse studios were also renamed under Infogrames branding as well, becoming Infogrames Hunt Valley and Infogrames Chippenham respectively. Infogrames would later shut down the Chippenham studio in September 2002.

Infogrames intermittently used the Atari name as a brand name for selected titles before officially changing the U.S. subsidiary's name to Atari, Inc. in 2003., with the Hunt Valley briefly being renamed as "Atari Hunt Valley". In November 2003, Atari closed the last former MicroProse development studio in Hunt Valley, which was MicroProse's original location and had just completed work on Dungeons & Dragons: Heroes. However, several game developers now exist in the area, including Firaxis Games and BreakAway Games, who all owe their origin to MicroProse.

Brand revival (2019–present) 
In 2019, the MicroProse brand (then owned by Cybergun) was purchased and revived by David Lagettie, one of the makers of TitanIM open world military simulation software. Lagettie was a former developer for Bohemia Interactive at their Australian studios before starting his own company to create video game simulators to be used by military groups. Lagettie had been a fan of the original MicroProse games growing up, and as he saw the games ownership transition made the company eventually disappear, he started investigating the fate of MicroProse around 2005. When possible, he began buying whatever IP from MicroProse he could, including the name and original logo trademarks, allowing him to establish the new MicroProse as a games publisher by 2019. Lagettie's acquisitions drew the attention of Stealey, who subsequently inquired Lagettie about his plans, leading to Stealey joining Lagettie in an unofficial manner in the new MicroProse.

The new company announced in May 2020 the first of three new games to be released for personal computers: Triassic Games' Sea Power, Drydock Dreams' Task Force Admiral, and Hexdraw's Second Front, with about twenty additional titles planned out for publishing in the future. Lagettie said that while the new MicroProse will branch out to other genres such as adventure and racing games, their core portfolio will be centered on combat-based ones.

Games

Games by MicroProse include Civilization (1991), Civilization II (1996), Darklands (1992), F-15 Strike Eagle (1985), F-19 Stealth Fighter (1988), Formula One Grand Prix (1992), Grand Prix 2 (1995), Grand Prix World (1999), Gunship (1986), M1 Tank Platoon (1989), Master of Magic (1994), Master of Orion (1993), Master of Orion II (1996), Midwinter (1989), Pirates! (1987), Project Stealth Fighter (1987), Railroad Tycoon (1990), Red Storm Rising (1988), Silent Service (1985), and X-COM: UFO Defense (1994).

Legacy

Sid Meier, who now works at Firaxis Games, eventually got the rights of most of his games back under his control from Atari Inc. Railroad Tycoon series rights was sold to PopTop Software, who developed Railroad Tycoon II and Railroad Tycoon 3. Eventually, Poptop was acquired by Take-Two Interactive, which later also acquired Firaxis as well, thus returning the rights to the series to Meier, resulting in Sid Meier's Railroads!, released by Take-Two's 2K Games along with a new Sid Meier's Pirates! and the new Civilization games, including Sid Meier's Civilization III, Sid Meier's Civilization IV, Sid Meier's Civilization V, Sid Meier's Civilization IV: Colonization and Sid Meier's Civilization Revolution. Firaxis Games also developed the X-COM series' reboot XCOM: Enemy Unknown, which was followed by 2K Marin's spin-off The Bureau: XCOM Declassified.Master of Orion III was developed by Quicksilver Software and released under the Infogrames label. Falcon 4.0 rights were sold to Graphsim Entertainment, who developed Falcon 4.0: Allied Force.

Brand name
In 2007, Interactive Game Group acquired the MicroProse brand from Atari Interactive Inc, which filed for transfer of trademark protection on December 27, 2007. Interactive Game Group then shared a percentage of the MicroProse brand to I-Drs At in January 2008. Originally, claims as to what titles and other intellectual properties were also acquired by the Interactive Game Group from Infogrames were originally unverified, and the last verified owner of MicroProse properties was Infogrames. Later on, however, MicroProse's IPs that remained with Atari/Infogrames were eventually included as part of asset sale and sold to Tommo, who have been republish the titles under their "Retroism" brand.

The Interactive Game Group also licensed the MicroProse brand to the Legacy Engineering Group (LEG), which used the license to form subsidiaries called Microprose Systems and Microprose Consumer Electronics Division, selling consumer electronics from February 2008 to the second half of 2008. In October 2008, the licensing agreement between LEG and Frederic Chesnais, owner of Interactive Game Group, was discontinued, forcing LEG to rebrand its subsidiaries to Legacy Consumer Electronics.

In 2010, the Cybergun Group, manufacturer of airsoft gun products, merged with Interactive Game Group and MicroProse, giving them access to officially licensed weapons. The name has been used by a video game studio Microprose (with no capital "P" in the name).

Since 2018, the MicroProse brand has been owned by David Lagettie, working with Bill Stealey's own company iEntertainment Network on the WarBirds series of combat flight simulators. Since its revival by Lagettie in 2019, it had announced Sea Power: Naval Combat in the Missile Age by the developer Triassic Games AB, Task Force Admiral - Vol.1: American Carrier Battles by Drydock Dreams Games, Operation: Harsh Doorstop by Drakeling Labs, and Warfare 1944'' by Drakeling Labs.

Notes

References

External links
 MicroProse, official website
 MicroProse company profile at MobyGames

 
Defunct companies based in Maryland
Video game development companies
Video game companies established in 1982
Video game companies disestablished in 2003
Defunct video game companies of the United States
1982 establishments in Nevada
2003 disestablishments in Maryland